Nunatakassaup Sermia (old spelling: Nunatakavsaup Sermia) is a tidewater glacier in Avannaata municipality on the northwestern shore of Greenland. It drains the Greenland ice sheet westwards into Melville Bay. The glacier front is located between the Nunatakassak nunatak in the north, and the Wandel Land nunatak in the south.

References 

Melville Bay
Glaciers of the Upernavik Archipelago